Jamaican Maroon language, Maroon Spirit language, Kromanti, Jamaican Maroon Creole or Deep patwa is a ritual language and formerly mother tongue of Jamaican Maroons.  It is an English-based creole with a strong Akan component, specifically from the Fante dialect of the Central Region of Ghana.  It is distinct from usual Jamaican Creole, being similar to the creoles of Sierra Leone (Krio) and Suriname such as Sranan and Ndyuka.  It is also more purely Akan than regular Patois, with little to no contribution from other African languages.  Today, the Maroon Spirit language is used by Jamaican Maroons (largely Coromantees). Another distinct ritual language (also called Kromanti) consisting mostly of words and phrases from Akan languages, is also used by Jamaican Maroons in certain rituals including some involving possession by ancestral spirits during Kromanti ceremonies or when addressing those who are possessed and sometimes used as a kind of code. 

The term "Kromanti" is used by participants in such ceremonies to refer to an African language spoken by ancestors in the distant past, prior to the creolization of Jamaican Maroon Creole. This term is used to refer to a language which is "clearly not a form of Jamaican Creole and displays very little English content" (Bilby 1983: 38). While Kromanti is not a functioning language, those possessed by ancestral spirits are attributed the ability to speak it. More remote ancestors are compared with more recent ancestors on a gradient, such that increasing strength and ability in the use of the non-creolized Kromanti are attributed to increasingly remote ancestors (as opposed to the Jamaican Maroon Creole used to address these ancestors).

The language was brought along by the maroon population to Cudjoe's Town (Trelawny Town) to Nova Scotia in 1796, where they were sent in exile. They eventually traveled to Sierra Leone in 1800. Their creole language highly influenced the local creole language that evolved into present day Krio.

Some phonological characteristics of Jamaican Maroon Creole 
Bilby discusses several phonological distinctions between Jamaican Creole and Jamaican Maroon Creole.

Vowel epithesis: Some words in the Maroon Creole have a vowel in the final syllable, compared to Jamaican Creole. Some examples are:

  "to fight"
  "forest"
  "mouth"

Liquids: Many words that have a lateral liquid /l/ in Jamaican Creole have a trill /r/ in Maroon Creole. Some examples are:

  "pleased"
  "black"
  "belly"

/ai/ to /e/: There are several instances where the "deep creole" uses /e/ while the "normal creole" uses /ai/.

See also
Jamaican Maroon religion
Spirit possession
Sierra Leonean Krio
West African Pidgin English

References

English-based pidgins and creoles
Jamaican Maroons
Languages of Jamaica
Ritual languages
Extinct languages of North America
Languages of the African diaspora
Spirit possession